Jiří Palko (17 March 1941 – 2 February 2014) was a Czech rower. He competed in the men's coxed pair event at the 1964 Summer Olympics.

References

1941 births
2014 deaths
Czech male rowers
Olympic rowers of Czechoslovakia
Rowers at the 1964 Summer Olympics
Rowers from Prague